John Moultrie  (18 January 1729 – 1798) was an English politician who served as deputy governor of East Florida in the years before the American Revolutionary War. He became acting governor when his predecessor, James Grant, was invalided home in 1771 and held the position until 1774. Moultrie again became a deputy under his successor, Patrick Tonyn, returning to Great Britain in 1784.

Early life and education 
Moultrie was one of five brothers who became a doctor after obtaining a medical degree from the University of Edinburgh in 1749.

Personal life 
Moultrie was married twice, first to Dorothy Mortin in 1753 and later to Eleanor Austin in 1762. Moultrie, after practising as a doctor in Charlestown, moved to East Florida in 1767 and became a planter.

Following the Revolutionary War and the loss of Florida by the British, Moultrie moved to England, where he settled at Aston Hall, which his wife had inherited from her father, at Shifnal in Shropshire, and died there in 1798. He was buried at Shifnal Church. In 1809, his daughter Cecilia married the naval officer John Bligh at St Marylebone. Moultrie's grandson, John Moultrie, was an English clergyman hymn-writer. His great-grandson, Gerard Moultrie, was also a hymn-writer.

Family 
Of his brothers, three were other key players on opposing sides of the Revolutionary War:
William Moultrie (1730–1805) was a Patriot General of the Continental Army. 
James Moultrie (died 1765) was Chief Justice of British East Florida.
Captain Thomas Moultrie was commanding officer of the 2nd South Carolina Regiment of the Continental Army.
Colonel Alexander Moultrie was the first Attorney General of the State of South Carolina from 1776 to 1792.

References

1729 births
1798 deaths
Governors of East Florida
Alumni of the University of Edinburgh
People from Charleston, South Carolina
American militia officers
People of South Carolina in the French and Indian War